Rafael Castillejo (1952 – 4 June 2021) was a Spanish researcher, cultural activist, and writer.

He was the author of Recuerdos Compartidos -Memorias de un niño nacido en los cincuenta.

He was a prolific photographer.

References

1952 births
2021 deaths
Spanish activists
Spanish bloggers
People from Zaragoza